This is a list of Ultimate Muscle episodes.

Episodes

Season 1: 2002–2003

DMP arc (2002)

Generation X arc (2002–2003)

The Gruesome Threesome arc (2003)

Poison Six-Pac arc (2003)

Season 2: 2003–2004

Chojin Crown arc (2003–2004)

References

External links
FoxBox Ultimate Muscle site from 2004
Kinnikuman: Nisei Toei homepage (in Japanese)
Kinnikuman: Nisei Toei homepage (in Japanese, 2002)
Kinnikuman: Nisei Toei homepage (in Japanese, 2006)
Kinnikuman Nisei: Ultimate Muscle 2 TV Tokyo homepage (in Japanese, 2006)
Episode Descriptions

Ultimate Muscle
2